Kelly Druyts (born 21 November 1989) is a Belgian racing cyclist, who currently rides for UCI Women's Continental Team . She finished in second place in the Belgian National Road Race Championships in 2010. She won a bronze medal in the scratch race at the 2012 UCI Track Cycling World Championships, and gold in the scratch race at the 2014 Championships.

Druyts is from a sporting family: her father, Ronny, played youth football with Beerschot AC and at the senior level with Dynamo Niel, where he was a champion in the Belgian Provincial leagues, her sister Steffy was a multiple national champion in gymnastics, and she is the sister of racing cyclists Jessy Druyts, Demmy Druyts, Lenny Druyts and Gerry Druyts. Kelly was a national champion in triathlon and duathlon before focussing on cycling.

Major results

Road

2006
 1st Grimbergen Juniors
2007
 1st Hoogstraten-Wortel
2008
 3rd Time trial, National Road Championships
2009
 1st Road race, Brabant Provincial Road Championships
 1st Incourt
 1st Beauraing
 3rd Road race, National Road Championships
 3rd Omloop Het Nieuwsblad
 4th Sparkassen Giro Bochum
 9th Road race, UEC European Under-23 Road Championships
2010
 2nd Road race, National Road Championships
 10th Sparkassen Giro
2012
 1st Road race, Antwerp Provincial Road Championships
 6th Overall Belgium Tour
 6th Omloop van het Hageland
2013
 5th Erondegemse Pijl
 6th Knokke-Heist – Bredene
 7th Omloop van het Hageland
2014
 1st Hillegemum
 1st Stage 6 Trophée d'Or Féminin
 1st Stage 4 Holland Ladies Tour
 3rd Diamond Tour
 7th Gooik–Geraardsbergen–Gooik
 7th Sparkassen Giro Bochum
2015
 2nd Diamond Tour
 8th La Madrid Challenge by La Vuelta
2016
 3rd Trofee Maarten Wynants
 5th Erondegemse Pijl
 8th Le Samyn des Dames
 9th Diamond Tour
 10th Grand Prix de Dottignies
2017
 3rd Road race, National Road Championships
 5th Grand Prix de Dottignies
 10th Erondegemse Pijl
2018
 1st Road race, Antwerp Provincial Road Championships
 1st Stage 3 Panorama Guizhou International Women's Road Cycling Race
 6th Overall Tour of Zhoushan Island
1st Stage 3
 7th Brabantse Pijl
 8th Omloop van Borsele
 10th Overall Tour of Chongming Island
2019
 4th Diamond Tour
 5th Erondegemse Pijl
 7th MerXem Classic
 7th Grand Prix International d'Isbergues

Track

2007
 National Track Championships
1st  Individual pursuit
1st  Keirin
1st  Team sprint (with Jenifer De Merlier)
1st  Points race
2009
 1st  Omnium, National Track Championships
 2nd  Team pursuit, UEC European Under-23 Track Championships (with Jolien D'Hoore and Jessie Daams)
2010
 UEC European Under-23 Track Championships
1st  Team pursuit (with Jolien D'Hoore and Jessie Daams)
2nd  Scratch
 2nd  Scratch, 2010–11 UCI Track Cycling World Cup Classics, Cali
2011
 1st  Scratch, 2011–12 UCI Track Cycling World Cup, Cali
2012
 3rd  Scratch, UCI Track Cycling World Championships
2013
 National Track Championships
1st  500m time trial
1st  Points race
 2nd Points race, Grand Prix of Poland
 3rd Points race, International Belgian Open
2014
 1st  Scratch, UCI Track Cycling World Championships
 Belgian Xmas Meetings
1st Points race
1st Scratch
 2nd  Points race, UEC European Track Championships
 International Belgian Open
2nd Points race
3rd Scratch

References

External links

1989 births
Living people
Belgian female cyclists
People from Wilrijk
UCI Track Cycling World Champions (women)
Cyclists at the 2015 European Games
European Games competitors for Belgium
Cyclists from Antwerp
Belgian track cyclists
21st-century Belgian women